Manuel Aranguiz (born October 15, 1945) is a Chilean Canadian actor and writer. He is most noted for his performance in the 1989 film The Paper Wedding (Les Noces de papier), for which he won the Gémeaux Award for Best Actor in a Television Film or Miniseries in 1990.

His other most prominent role as an actor was in the 1994 film Eclipse; however, his acting career was somewhat limited by a perception that he was too "ethnic" for the Quebec film and television industries, and he generally only had small supporting or guest roles rather than major starring performances. 

Some of his poetry was set to music by the Latin jazz ensemble Intakto on their albums Intakto (2002) and Todavia (2007); Intakto won the Félix Award for World Music Album of the Year at the 25th Felix Awards in 2003, and was a Juno Award nominee for World Music Album of the Year at the Juno Awards of 2004.

Filmography

References

External links

1945 births
Living people
20th-century Canadian male actors
20th-century Chilean male actors
21st-century Canadian male actors
21st-century Chilean male actors
20th-century Canadian poets
20th-century Chilean poets
21st-century Canadian poets
21st-century Chilean poets
20th-century Canadian male writers
20th-century Chilean male writers
21st-century Canadian male writers
21st-century Chilean male writers
Canadian male film actors
Canadian male television actors
Canadian male poets
Chilean male film actors
Chilean male television actors
Chilean male poets
Chilean emigrants to Canada
Male actors from Santiago
Male actors from Montreal
Writers from Santiago
Writers from Montreal